The Mummy's Hand is a 1940 American black-and-white horror film directed by Christy Cabanne and produced by Ben Pivar for Universal Studios. The film is about the ancient Egyptian mummy of Kharis (Tom Tyler), who is kept alive with a brew of tana leaves by The High Priest (Eduardo Ciannelli) and his successor Andoheb (George Zucco). Meanwhile, archeologists Steve Banning (Dick Foran) and Babe Jenson (Wallace Ford) persuade magician Solvani (Cecil Kellaway) to finance an expedition in search of the tomb of Princess Ananka. They are joined by Solvani's daughter Marta (Peggy Moran), and followed by Andoheb who is also the professor of Egyptology at the Cairo Museum. Kharis is ordered to kill off expedition members Dr. Petrie (Charles Trowbridge) and Ali (Leon Belasco), while Andoheb becomes attracted to Marta who he plans to kidnap and make immortal.

The Mummy's Hand was made after the financial success of two other Universal Products: Son of Frankenstein and The Invisible Man Returns which led to the studio making a follow-up to The Mummy (1932). The film had what was described as a "modest" budget and reuses footage from The Mummy as well as reusing nearly the entire score from Son of Frankenstein. However, the film has no shared plot with the original film and is not considered a sequal nor a remake. The film was shot with a planned budget of $80,000 but went $4,000 over-budget as production completed. The film was released on September 20, 1940, and was followed by a sequel titled The Mummy's Tomb in 1942.

Plot
In Egypt, Andoheb travels to the Hill of the Seven Jackals in answer to the summons of The High Priest of Karnak. The dying priest of the sect explains the story of Kharis to Andoheb: over three thousand years ago Prince Kharis had secretly loved Princess Ananka, but she died. Kharis stole sacred, life-giving tana leaves, but he was caught before he could use them to restore life to the dead Princess Ananka. Kharis's penalty upon being discovered was to be buried alive, without a tongue, and the tana leaves were buried with him. Priests recovered him and kept him alive as protector of Ananka's tomb. During the cycle of the full moon, the fluid from the brew of three tana leaves must be administered to the creature to keep him alive. Should despoilers enter the tomb of the Princess, a fluid of nine leaves will restore movement to the monster so he can protect it from defilers. Any more than nine will make him uncontrollable.

In Cairo, down on his luck archaeologist Steve Banning and his buffoon sidekick, Babe Jenson, discover the remnants of a broken vase in a bazaar. Banning is convinced it is an authentic ancient Egyptian relic, and his interpretation of the hieroglyphs on the piece leads him to believe it contains clues to the location of Princess Ananka's tomb. Banning visits Andoheb, who misleads him about the importance of the vase and then drops and breaks it on purpose. With the support of the eminent Dr. Petrie of the Cairo Museum, but against the wishes of Andoheb, who is professor of Egyptology at the museum, Banning seeks funds for his expedition. Banning and Jenson meet an American stage magician, Solvani, who agrees to fund their quest in return for a share of the spoils of the tomb. They then get into a scuffle with Andoheb's henchmen. Solvani's daughter Marta is not convinced of his investment, thanks to a prior visit from Andoheb, who brands the two young archeologists as frauds.

The expedition departs in search of the Hill of the Seven Jackals, with the Solvanis tagging along. In their explorations, they stumble upon the tomb of Kharis, finding the mummy and the tana leaves but nothing to indicate the existence of Ananka's tomb. Andoheb surprises Dr. Petrie in the mummy's cave and has the scientist feel the creature's living pulse. After administering the tana brew from nine leaves, the monster quickly dispatches Petrie by strangling him with one hand, and escapes with Andoheb through a secret passageway to the temple on the other side of the mountain. The creature marauds about the camp, strangling the Egyptian overseer Ali and eventually attacking Solvani and kidnapping Marta. Banning and Jenson set out to track Kharis down, with Jenson going around the mountain and Banning attempting to follow the secret passage they have discovered inside the tomb.

Andoheb has plans of his own: enthralled by Marta's beauty, he plans to inject himself and his captive with tana fluid, making them both immortal. Jenson arrives in the nick of time and shoots Andoheb dead in self-defense, while Banning attempts to rescue Marta. However, Kharis appears on the scene and in the ensuing struggle, Banning's bullets have no effect on the mummy. Marta had overheard Adoheb describe the secret of the tana fluid and tells Banning and Jenson that Kharis must not be allowed to drink any more of it. When the creature raises the tana fluid to his lips, Jenson shoots the container from his grasp. Dropping to the floor, Kharis attempts to ingest the spilled life-giving liquid. Banning seizes the opportunity to overturn a brazier onto the monster, engulfing it in flames.

At the end, the members of the expedition head happily back to the United States with the mummy of Ananka and the diamonds from her tomb.

Cast
Cast is sourced from the book Universal Horrors and the end of film credits:

Production
Following the financial success of the revival of the Frankenstein series with Son of Frankenstein and The Invisible Man series with The Invisible Man Returns, Universal Pictures decided to revive their The Mummy series with The Mummy's Hand. The film's budget was set at $80,000 and began filming towards the end of May 1940.

The authors of the book Universal Horrors described the budget as "modest" and noted that cost-cutting for the film involved using stock shots taken from The Mummy, leftover sets from James Whale's film Green Hell, and musical scores almost entirely lifted from Son of Frankenstein. The producer for the film was Ben Pivar, who Reginald LeBorg described as the epitome artless, noncreative studio executive who was often crude and occasionally seemed illiterate.

The Mummy's Hands production continued into mid-June, which led director Christy Cabanne and his crew to film into overtime hours. According to Peggy Moran, she had to be on set at 6am to do hair and makeup and filming began at 8am and would occasionally work as late as 4am the next day.  
 Moran commented that "they could do that with people like me because we were under contract. The law requires that outside talent only work for X-number of hours, but me they could work all the time!"  When asked about her fellow cast, she spoke positively about Dick Foran ("very nice and friendly") and Wallace Ford ("very funny always"). On Tom Tyler who played Kharis, she never met him without his make-up on, stating that he had to be at the studio at four in the morning and he couldn't talk with his make-up on. Dick Foran, who played main character Steve Banning, was an established star when he made this, but his career prior to The Mummy's Hand consisted mostly of supporting roles in second tier Universal films and leading roles in "singing cowboy" movies. 

The film still went over-budget and slightly over-schedule costing an extra $4,000. The film was finished editing before the end of June.

Release
The Mummy's Hand was distributed by Universal Pictures Co. on September 20, 1940. According to Variety, their screening of the film had certain scenes tinted an "eerie green".

The film was followed by the sequel The Mummy's Tomb in 1942 which followed the storyline of two key characters from The Mummy's Hand and included several minutes of footage from The Mummy's Hand flashback sequences. Unlike some of the other horror films produced by Universal, The Mummy's Hand was not reissued for theatrical release in the late 1940s and early 1950s.

Critical response
From contemporary reviews, film critic Bosley Crowther wrote for The New York Times: "It's the usual mumbo-jumbo of secret tombs in crumbling temples and salacious old high priests guarding them against the incursions of an archaeological expedition, led this time by Dick Foran, Peggy Moran and Wallace Ford. While the scientists busily explore dank passageways and decipher weird hieroglyphics on tombs and chests, jackals howl outside, the native work-gangs mutiny and the mummy is always just around the corner. Once or twice Miss Moran makes a grimace — as if she had caught an unpleasant odor — and screams. Otherwise every one seems remarkably casual. If they don't seem to worry, why should we? Frightening or funny, take your choice". The Philadelphia Record found that the film's plot was "sheer nonsense" but that the film "manages to raise a few more goose pimples than other recent horror movies". "Hobe" of Variety found the film to be "muddled in the writing and clumsy in the production. Direction and photography are bush league. Acting varies from violent mugging to smooth under-playing".

Graeme Clark of The Spinning Image comparing the film with Boris Karloff's and granting 6 out of 10 stars, writes: "This was no eerie love story across the millennia, this was straight fright fare with Universal Studios' least-loved monster, here in the form that viewers would know him best, shambling, strangling, singleminded and mute. A nice touch is that his eyes have been blacked out for his closeups, giving him an undead look. However, more than half the short movie is over before we get to the creepy chase scenes..." 

The film holds a 67% "Fresh" rating on aggregate review site Rotten Tomatoes, based on 9 reviews, with an average score of 5.8/10.

References

Footnotes

Sources

External links

 

Joe Dante on The Mummy's Hand at Trailers from Hell

1940 films
1940 horror films
American black-and-white films
American supernatural horror films
Ancient Egypt in fiction
Films directed by Christy Cabanne
Films scored by Frank Skinner
Films scored by Hans J. Salter
Films set in Egypt
Mummy films
Universal Pictures films
1940s English-language films
1940s American films